Valley Chapel is an unincorporated community in Lewis County, West Virginia, United States. Valley Chapel had a post office, which closed on January 24, 1998.

The community was named after the nearby Valley Chapel church.

References

Unincorporated communities in Lewis County, West Virginia
Unincorporated communities in West Virginia